Tales from the Crypt is the second studio album by American rapper C-Bo, released June 15, 1995, on AWOL Records. It peaked at number 4 on the Billboard Top R&B/Hip-Hop Albums and at number 99 on the Billboard 200. The album includes a guest appearance by E-40. Along with a single, a music video was produced for the song "Birds in the Kitchen".

West Coast Mafia Records, C-Bo's own label, reissued Tales from the Crypt in 2002.

Track listing
"Jackin' and Assassin'" - 0:08
"Murder That He Ritt" - 3:51
"Free Style" (featuring Mississippi) - 5:12
"Hard Core" - 3:44
"Want to Be a "G"" - 3:12
"Stompin' In My Steel Toes" (featuring Marvaless) - 4:01
"Birds In the Kitchen" - 4:30
"187 Dance" - 4:05
"Groovin' On Sunday" (Radio) (featuring Mississippi) - 3:06
"Who Ride" (featuring Snap) - 3:07
"Take It How You Want Too" (featuring Marvaless) - 3:58
"Ain't No Sunshine" (featuring Tuna Bug & Mississippi) - 4:10

Charts

Weekly charts

Year-end charts

References

External links
 Tales from the Crypt at Discogs
 Tales from the Crypt at MusicBrainz

C-Bo albums
1995 albums
Self-released albums
G-funk albums